Kalindaruk (also, Calendaruc, Kathlendaruc, and Katlendarukas) is a former Ohlone Native American settlement in Monterey County, California. Its precise location is unknown.

References

See also
Population of Native California
Native American history of California

Costanoan populated places
Former settlements in Monterey County, California
Former Native American populated places in California
California Mission Indians